Circa Waves are an English indie rock band formed in Liverpool in 2013. The band consists of lead vocalist and guitarist Kieran Shudall, guitarist Joe Falconer, bassist Sam Rourke, and drummer Colin Jones.

History

Early years (2013)
Shudall met both Rourke and Plummer through mutual friends at the annual music festival Liverpool Sound City in 2013, meeting Falconer not long after at the same festival where he worked as a stage manager. During the summer and autumn of 2013 the band played several short UK tours, which included some secret shows. In a July 2014 interview in Paris, Falconer stated regarding the band name's origin, "Kieran wrote the demo for "Young Chasers", recorded it and uploaded it to SoundCloud in one day. As he was uploading it he needed a name and it was the first thing that came into his head in that split second."

Debut single and Young Chasers EP (2013–2014)
On 2 December 2013, the band released their debut single "Get Away/Good for Me", a double A-side on Transgressive Records handled by Jen Long's Kissibility label. In February 2014, radio DJ Zane Lowe played the band's second single "Stuck in My Teeth" as his Hottest Record in the World. The band opened the NME Awards Tour in March 2014, which also included Temples, Interpol and Royal Blood. On 10 June 2014 Circa Waves released their Young Chasers EP on Virgin Records in the US. A Japanese edition was released on 2 July 2014.

Also during 2014 they supported the 1975 on tour around the UK.

Circa Waves performed at various festivals during the summer of 2014, including Hurricane and Southside Festivals in Germany, Latitude Festival, T in the Park, Glastonbury Festival, and Splendour in the Grass (Australia). They also performed at Arenal Sound (Spain), Summer Sonic Festival in Japan, and at Reading and Leeds Festival at the end of August 2014.

The band also supported the Libertines in September 2014.

Young Chasers (2014–2015)
The band released their debut studio album, Young Chasers, on 30 March 2015 which reached 10 in the UK Album Charts and performed at a number of festivals, including Glastonbury, Reading and Leeds and Boardmasters. In October 2015, the band toured the UK, including a sold out date at Brixton Academy.

Different Creatures (2016–2018)
Circa Waves announced their second studio album, Different Creatures, on 24 November 2016, releasing the first single from the album "Wake Up" the same day.

The second single from the album, "Fire That Burns", was released on 26 January 2017. The album was released on 10 March 2017.

The album was released on 10 March 2017, and peaked on the UK Albums Chart at number 11.

What's It Like Over There (2019)
On 5 April 2019 the band released their third studio album titled, What's It Like Over There?, to critical success. It was supported by the singles, "Times Won't Change Me", "Movies", and "The Way We Say Goodbye". The album earned critical acclaim for its mix of indie and pop rock, as well as the experimentation by the band. It peaked at Number 10 on the UK Albums Chart.

Sad Happy (2019–present)
On 19 November 2019 the band released the single "Jacqueline" via BBC Radio 1. The single was accompanied by the announcement of their upcoming studio album Sad Happy. The album was released in two parts, with the Happy side released in January 2020 and the Sad side followed in March 2020. According to the band, the double album concept "represents two sides of this tech-saturated, highly insecure age".

Band members
Current
 Kieran Shudall – lead vocals, rhythm guitar (2013–present)
 Joe Falconer – lead guitar, piano, backing vocals (2013–present)
 Sam Rourke – bass guitar, keyboard, backing vocals (2013–present)
 Colin Jones – drums (2015–present)

Former
 Sian Plummer – drums (2013–2015)

Discography

Studio albums

Extended plays

Singles

Promotional singles

Notes

References

External links
 NME video interview
 
 
 

English indie rock groups
Musical groups established in 2013
Musical groups from Liverpool
Dew Process artists
2013 establishments in England